Kaleida is an unincorporated community in south central Manitoba, Canada. It is located approximately 28 kilometers (17 miles) southwest of Morden, Manitoba in the Municipality of Pembina. Kaleida has a population of 10 as of June 2021.

See also 
List of regions of Manitoba
List of rural municipalities in Manitoba

References 

Unincorporated communities in Pembina Valley Region